Baillet is a surname. Notable people with the surname include:

 House of Baillet, created count of Baillet by emperor Charles VI, members of the Belgian Nobility.
 Alfred de Baillet Latour
 Christophe-Ernest, 1st Count of Baillet
 Henri de Baillet-Latour
 Theodor Franz, Count Baillet von Latour
 Maximilian Anton Karl, Count Baillet de Latour
 Ferdinand de Baillet-Latour
 Artois-Baillet Latour Foundation

Other 
Adrien Baillet

Counts of Baillet-Latour
Surnames from nicknames